Finlaycolor was an early color photography process.

In Uncle Tungsten, Oliver Sacks reminisces:

See also
Finlay colour process
History of photography
List of photographic processes

References

History of photography